Sofia Marjanna Virta (born 21 June 1990 in Kaarina) is a Finnish politician currently serving in the Parliament of Finland for the Green League at the Varsinais-Suomi constituency.

Education and Earlier Career
Education

– Master of Educational Sciences

– Teacher's pedagogical studies

– Solution-oriented psychotherapy training (University of the West of England)

– Blended family counselor

Work Experience

– Entrepreneur in therapy and teaching

– Third sector project work

– Protection of special children & youth work, demanding social family work

– Field of education (primary level, second level, special education)

– Nursing work (elderly work, work with intellectual disabilities)

– Mental health and substance abuse work, family work

– Project expertise

– Sales and marketing

Political career 
Virta has grown up in a politically non-committed family. Her political career is still relatively short but all the more intense. She has taken part in four elections and gained a considerable amount of trust, experiencing an electoral victory in every single election.

In the spring 2017 municipal elections, she became a member of the Kaarina city council (election budget 500e). She was re-elected in the 2021 elections.

In the spring 2019 parliamentary elections, she became a member of the Parliament of Finland (election budget less than 2500e).

In the beginning of 2022, she was elected to the Varsinais-Suomen regional council (election budget 1500e), where she acts as the chairman of the green council group.

Virta's Politics
Virta's values in life and politics are justice, honesty and caring. The reason she got involved in politics was due to her background in education and social services: she wanted to make their voice and concerns heard, who can't do it themselves. Having learned from the field, she also knows very well how important it is to take care of the well-being of the employees.

At the heart of her politics and thinking is a safe childhood. She wants to defend every child's right to a safe childhood and an intact youth. Virta wants to contribute to the fact that no one would have to fight to get help for themselves or their loved ones. According to Sofia, the child's rights should be realized in all situations. Decision-making should be humane and sustainable.

Virta has spoken especially about securing mental health and substance abuse services and strengthening child and family services. According to her, we should invest especially in support aimed at young people. She has also spoken about the prevention of violence and the structures of anti-violence work. Animal rights and entrepreneurship are also at the center of her politics.

Present memberships in committees
Social Affairs and Health Committee (member) 18.06.2019–

Committee for the Future (deputy member) 18.06.2019–

Employment and Equality Committee (member) 18.06.2019–

Parliamentary Trustees of the Social Insurance Institution of Finland (deputy member) 18.06.2019–

References

https://www.eduskunta.fi/EN/kansanedustajat/Pages/1411.aspx

https://www.sofiavirta.fi

1990 births
Living people
People from Kaarina
Green League politicians
Members of the Parliament of Finland (2019–23)
21st-century Finnish women politicians
Women members of the Parliament of Finland